This is a list of the 250 members of the 2007–2008 National Assembly of Serbia, as well as a list of former members of the 2007–2008 National Assembly.

The 2007–2008 National Assembly was elected in the 2007 parliamentary election, and it held its first session on 14 February 2007. The 2007–2008 National Assembly was the 7th assembly since the reestablishment of the multi-party system, after the 1990 parliamentary election.

MPs by party

List of members of the 7th National Assembly

List of former members of the 7th National Assembly

References

2007